This is a list of Canadian films which were released in 2000:

See also
 2000 in Canada
 2000 in Canadian television

External links
Feature Films Released In 2000 With Country of Origin Canada at IMDb

2000
2000 in Canadian cinema
Canada